Panart was one of the first and most successful independent record labels in Cuba, founded in 1944 by engineer Ramón Sabat. In 1961, its studios were seized by Fidel Castro's communist regime and the label was nationalized, becoming "Panart Nacionalizada", which shortly after was absorbed by EGREM.

Together with RCA Victor's, Panart studios were the main recording studios in Cuba during the 1950s. Since the 1960s, they are known as the Areito studios, owned by EGREM. In addition, Panart acted as a distributor for Odeon, Musart, Sonora and Capitol Records. Its only sublabel, Sonoro, was established in 1949 and signed several trova acts such as Los Compadres.

In 2016, Panart was acquired by Concord Bicycle Music (renamed Concord in 2019) as a part of its purchase of Musart. Within Concord, Panart is operated as an imprint of the historical reissue label Craft Recordings.

History

Origins and expansion
After studying music, joining the army and obtaining a degree in engineering, Ramón Sabat began working in several music labels in New York City. In 1943, the label he was working in, Musicraft, folded, and he decided to bring the necessary assets to Cuba to fulfill his desire of establishing his own Cuban-based record company. Thus in 1944 Sabat became the founder and president of the Cuban Plastics & Record Corporation. According to Irais Huerta Rubio, the majority stockholder of the company was a Cuban electric company controlled by an American holding company. In 1945, the company sold the whole of its shares to Sabat, becoming the sole owner of the company and launching it under the name Panart (sometimes stylized Pan-Art, short for Panamerican Art). His wife, Julia Sabat, became the vice-president, and millionaire Enrique Gorrín became its treasurer. The company's headquarters and recording studios were at San Miguel 410, between Campanario and Lealtad, in Havana, while the pressing plant was located outside of the city.

The first record released by Panart (cat. no. 1001) was a 10" single by Cascarita with the Julio Cueva Orchestra ("Ampárame" / "En el ñongo"). Eight more singles were released in 1944 and 83 in 1945, starting with Orquesta Hermanos Castro "Cucha el eco del tambó" / "Toda una vida" (cat. no. 1010). Although Panart is frequently mentioned as the first independent record label in Cuba, a small label called Star was established a few years prior, recording four songs by the Septeto Nacional in 1940. In 1949, Panart launched Sonoro, a sublabel dedicated to traditional folk music (mainly son in the trova style), including Trío Servando Díaz, Trío Caney, Los Incógnitos, Los Compadres and Compay Segundo in its initial roster.

In 1952, Panart obtained exclusive rights for the pressing of music licensed by Decca. A few years later this contract was broken as Decca reached an agreement with EMI/Capitol. The expansion of the record label was nonetheless unprecedented for a Caribbean label. After establishing a subsidiary (Panart Recording Corporation) in New York in 1952, the same year it pressed its first LPs, Panart was pressing half a million records a year, 20% of which was exported outside of Cuba (over 50% by 1959). Its dominance over the jukebox business in Cuba and the strategic (geographical) advantage over its main competitor, RCA Victor, explain part of Panart's success. Moreover, Panart was able to secure contracts with some of the most popular and innovative musicians and groups in the country, from Conjunto Casino to Julio Gutiérrez and Cachao.

Nationalization and aftermath 

After the Cuban Revolution, Cuban culture, including the record industry, was to be nationalized. Most Cuban record companies either folded or quickly relocated to Florida or Puerto Rico. Panart's fate was somewhat different, on May 29, 1961, its studios and factory were seized by the government. By that time, Ramón and Julia Sabat were already in the US. For a short period of time, until 1962, Panart's records were sold as "Panart Nacionalizada" to reflect this. Between 1962 and 1964, the Imprenta Nacional the Cuba acted as the only legal Cuban label. In 1964, the EGREM "trumpet" logo began to be used in stickers put over the Panart logo of previously released albums, and by the time Areito was founded as EGREM's main imprint in Panart's former facilities, Panart had disappeared from Cuban record stores.

Thanks to Julia Sabat, who sent the master copies from Havana to New York, around 80% of Panart's catalogue was "saved" before the government took over the company. Julia and her daughters then left Havana shortly after the Revolution, while Ramón remained in Cuba in charge of the company. Finally, in 1961, they managed to get Ramón out of Cuba. He and his wife established themselves in Miami. Julia started working in a record factory in Hialeah with Ramón's brother, Galo. Together they issued 1950s recordings made in Cuba on various imprints, including Adria Records and Puchito Records, all manufactured in Hialeah.

Competition 
Besides having to compete with major American record labels, primarily RCA Victor (or its subsidiary, Discuba, between 1959 and 1961), and to a lesser extent, Capitol, Panart had to compete with numerous independent Cuban records labels that were established during the 1950s following the success of Sabat's company. These Cuban labels include Puchito, Kubaney, Suaritos, Gema and Maype amongst others.

Roster 

Fernando Albuerne
Orquesta Almendra
Orquesta América
Orquesta América del 55
Carlos Barbería
Guillermo Barreto
Candita Batista
Alberto Beltrán
Lino Borges
Cachaíto
Cachao
Orquesta Hermanos Castro
Compay Segundo
Conjunto Casino
Conjunto Chappottín
Caridad Cuervo
Barbarito Díez
Carlos Embale
Dúo Cabrisas-Farach
Mary Esquivel
José Fajardo
Roberto Faz
Joseíto Fernández
Frank Emilio Flynn
Neno González
Bienvenido Granda
Los Guaracheros de Oriente
Julio Gutiérrez 
Gina Martin
Obdulio Morales
Miguel Matamoros
Ñico Membiela
Chico O'Farrill
Armando Oréfiche
Orquesta Típica Panart
Mario Patterson y su Orquesta Oriental
Peruchín
Orquesta Revé
Niño Rivera
Orquesta Riverside
Orquesta Antonio María Romeu
Conjunto Rumbavana
Filiberto Sánchez
Luis Santí
Daniel Santos
Ñico Saquito
Orquesta Serenata Española
Sonora Matancera
Merceditas Valdés
Orlando Vallejo
Ramón Veloz
Alberto Zayas

See also 

 List of record labels

References

External links 
Panart at Discogs.
Panart at Rate Your Music.

 
Cuban record labels
Record labels established in 1944
Record labels disestablished in 1961